Beauty and the Dogs is a 2017 internationally co-produced drama film directed by Kaouther Ben Hania. It premiered in the Un Certain Regard section at the 2017 Cannes Film Festival. It was selected as the Tunisian entry for the Best Foreign Language Film at the 91st Academy Awards, but was not nominated.

Plot
A young Tunisian woman is raped by police officers and seeks assistance in hospitals and police stations to register their crime while she is still under shock from the attack.  She encounters indifference, hostility, bureaucratic impediments and some assistance from the various individuals that she interacts with.  In the final scene, several police officers seek to intimidate the victim until one of the officers breaks from the group and encourages the victim to move ahead with her complaint.  Based on a true story.

Cast
 Mariam Al Ferjani as Mariam Chaouch
 Ghanem Zrelly as Youssef
 Noomen Hamda as Chedly
 Mohamed Akkari as Lamjed
 Chedly Arfaoui as Mounir
 Anissa Daoud as Faiza
 Mourad Gharsalli as Lassaad

See also
 List of submissions to the 91st Academy Awards for Best Foreign Language Film
 List of Tunisian submissions for the Academy Award for Best Foreign Language Film

References

External links
 

2017 films
2017 drama films
French drama films
Tunisian drama films
Swedish drama films
Lebanese drama films
Norwegian drama films
2010s Arabic-language films
Films about rape
Films about police misconduct
Films set in Tunisia
Films based on non-fiction books
Drama films based on actual events
2010s French films
2010s Swedish films